Aaron Esterson (23 September 1923 –15 April 1999) was a British psychiatrist, practising in Glasgow.

He was one of the founders of the Philadelphia Association along with R. D. Laing.  

Born in Glasgow in 1923, Esterson served in the Royal Navy as a wireless operator on a minesweeper during World War II.   After the war, he earned an M.D. from Glasgow University in 1951. He first was a general practitioner, then became a psychiatrist in 1954, after which he practiced in British mental hospitals and psychiatric units.  In 1962, he established a private practice as an existential psychoanalyst and family therapist.

Bibliography 
 Laing, R.D. & Esterson, A. (1958) Collusive Function of Pairing in Analytic Groups, British Journal of Medical Psychology
 Laing, R.D. & Esterson, A. (1964) Sanity, Madness, and the Family: Families of Schizophrenics. Penguin Books. 
 Esterson, A., Cooper D. and Laing, R.D. (1965) Results of family-oriented therapy with hospitalised schizophrenics, British Medical Journal
 Leaves of Spring: Study in the Dialectics of Madness (Stud. in Existentialism S)  (1970) Tavistock Publications 
 The Leaves of Spring: Study in the Dialectics of Madness (Pelican S.) (1972) Penguin Books Ltd

References

External links
Article on Sanity, Madness, and the Family

1923 births
1999 deaths
British psychiatrists
Anti-psychiatry
20th-century British medical doctors

Medical doctors from Glasgow
Alumni of the University of Glasgow Medical School